The 2006–07 Jordan FA Cup is the 27th edition of the Jordan FA Cup since its establishment in 1980. It started on 5 September 2006 and ended on 14 June 2007. Shabab Al-Ordon. The winner of the competition will earn a spot in the 2008 AFC Cup.

Shabab Al-Ordon won their second title after a 2–0 win over Al-Faisaly in the final on 14 June 2007.

Participating teams
A total of 22 teams participated in this season. 10 teams from the 2006–07 Jordan League, 12 teams from the First Division.

First round
In this round, each tie was played as a single match. Extra time and penalty shoot-out were used to decide the winner if necessary . The six winners of this round advanced to the round of 16 to join the 10 direct entrants.

Bracket

Note:     H: Home team,   A: Away team

Round of 16
The Round of 16 matches were played between 29 September and 1 October 2006.

Quarter-finals
The Quarter-finals matches were played between 10 November and 25 November 2006.

Semi-finals
The four winners of the quarter-finals progressed to the semi-finals. The semi-finals were played on 26 January 2007.

Final
The final was played on 14 June 2007 at Amman International Stadium.

Top goalscorers

References

External links

Jordan FA Cup seasons
Jordan
2006–07 in Jordanian football